Roza Dereje Bekele (born 9 May 1997) is an Ethiopian marathon runner.

Career 

In 2016 and 2017 she won the Shanghai Marathon.

In 2018, she won the Dubai Marathon in Dubai, United Arab Emirates with a time of 2:19:17 which was a new course record at the time. The following year Ruth Chepngetich set a new course record of 2:17:08.

In 2019, she finished in 3rd place in the London Marathon. In 2019, she also won the Valencia Marathon and she also set a new course record of 2:18:30. She also competed in the women's marathon at the 2019 World Athletics Championships held in Doha, Qatar. She did not finish her race.

She finished in 4th place in the women's marathon at the 2020 Summer Olympics.

Achievements

References

External links 
 

Living people
1997 births
Place of birth missing (living people)
Ethiopian female marathon runners
World Athletics Championships athletes for Ethiopia
Athletes (track and field) at the 2020 Summer Olympics
Olympic athletes of Ethiopia
Olympic female marathon runners
21st-century Ethiopian women